Leatherstocking is a 1924 American silent Western film serial directed by George B. Seitz.

Cast

Chapter titles

 The Warpath
 The Secret Trail
 The Hawk's Eyes
 The Paleface Law
 Ransom
 The Betrayal
 Rivenoak's Revenge
 Out of the Storm
 The Panther
 Mingo Torture

See also
 List of film serials
 List of film serials by studio

References

External links

 

1924 films
1924 lost films
1924 Western (genre) films
American silent serial films
American black-and-white films
Films based on works by James Fenimore Cooper
Films directed by George B. Seitz
Lost Western (genre) films
Pathé Exchange film serials
Silent American Western (genre) films
1920s American films